The 2010 Tour of California was the fifth running of the Tour of California cycling stage race. It was held from May 16–23, and was the first edition of the race held in the month of May, after the first four occurred in February. It was rated as a 2.HC event on the UCI America Tour. It began in Nevada City and concluded in the Agoura Hills.

The event's move to later in the year has made it so the route was different from previous editions of the race, and also provided for a different makeup of ridership, as it conflicted with the 2010 Giro d'Italia.

In other classifications, 's Peter Sagan won both the points and young rider classifications, Thomas Rabou of  won the mountains classification and Garmin-Transitions won the teams classification.

Participating teams
Sixteen teams participated in the Tour of California. These included seven UCI ProTour teams, two UCI Professional Continental teams, and seven UCI Continental teams. They were:

UCI ProTour Teams
 GRM – 
 LIQ – 
 QST – 
 RAB – 
 THR – 
 RSH – 
 SAX – 

UCI Professional Continental Teams
 BMC – 
 CTT – 

UCI Continental Teams
 BPC – 
 FAS – Fly V Australia
 JBC – 
 KBS – 
 CSM – SpiderTech-Planet Energy
 TT1 – 
 UHC – 

's Levi Leipheimer returned, to try for a fourth consecutive overall victory.

Changes from 2009
The 2010 Tour was the first to take place in May rather than February. This has allowed race organizers to move the race inland from the coastal route it used in its four editions. This eliminated Solvang, which had hosted an individual time trial in each of the last three editions of the race, from the route, along with other past cities. Moving to May allowed the race to visit some taller, more difficult climbs further inland, which were too cold to visit in February. Andrew Messick, president of Anschutz Entertainment Group (the organizers of the race), has said that the route for the 2010 Tour will be more difficult than it was in 2009, and that the May time position also moves them from cycling's "pre-season" and gives a better chance to showcase the race, as it now takes place at a time when more riders should be at or near peak form. Race officials also hoped to make the event a preparatory one for the Tour de France.

The race was held at the same time of year as the Giro d'Italia. Messick has admitted that this will probably result in fewer Italians starting this race, and fewer Americans in the Giro. However, the consensus among race organizers was that few riders who seek a high position in the Tour de France also ride the Giro d'Italia, so the possible loss of riders such as Carlos Sastre and Mark Cavendish (who rode the Tour of California, the Giro d'Italia, and the Tour de France in 2009) was not seen as a major risk.

Tour stages
The 2010 Tour was held over eight days, down from nine in 2009. This change is due to the current economic state after the recession of the last several years. The prologue has been eliminated.

Stage 1
May 16, 2010 — Nevada City to Sacramento, 

While past editions of the Tour of California began with a prologue time trial, the first stage in 2010 was a road race from Nevada City to the state capital Sacramento.

A four-rider breakaway took the intermediate sprints and the one small climb on the course. The riders in the break were Maarten Tjallingii, Marc de Maar, Paul Mach, and Chad Beyer. They attained a maximum advantage of close to six minutes, but  at the head of the peloton did not let them stay away. The catch occurred shortly before the circuits in Sacramento began. Team HTC-Columbia continued to control the race during the circuits in preparation for Mark Cavendish's sprint, except for a brief moment when  appeared at the head of the peloton to try to set up Juan José Haedo. Crashes depleted the leading group and reduced the number of sprinters present to try for the stage win, though all riders were given the same time as stage winner Cavendish since the crashes took place very close to the finish line on a flat stage. Time bonuses won during the stage meant the first general classification was not the same as the results of stage one.

Stage 2
May 17, 2010 — Davis to Santa Rosa, 

This stage was mostly flat, using most of the same course from stage 1 of the 2009 race.

The stage was slowed by rainy conditions. An early breakaway including Karl Menzies and Thomas Rabou was caught. A group of twenty riders made a dash for the finish, with the win and the leader's jersey going to Brett Lancaster. For his efforts in the breakaway, Rabou gained the climber's jersey and the most-aggressive rider title.

Stage 3
May 18, 2010 — San Francisco to Santa Cruz, 

This course included the Tour's first major climb, of Bonny Doon road,  from the finish. It was on this climb in the 2009 race that Leipheimer first took the lead that was eventually his overall margin of victory. At Bonny Doon, Levi Leipheimer, David Zabriskie, and Michael Rogers charged ahead.  The peloton gave chase, but failed to make the catch, ending up 17 seconds behind.  At the line it was Zabriskie who edged out the other two, to gain the time bonus and overall lead.

Stage 4
May 19, 2010 — San José to Modesto, 

This was a flat stage, and used the same course as Stage 3 from 2009. At the  mark, the peloton faced a difficult, technical climb up Sierra Road, but after descending it there were no further difficulties in the route. A mass sprint finish was expected, with the potential for high winds, common in the San Joaquin Valley, to make it so general classification contenders have to work hard to stay with the leading group.

Stage 5
May 20, 2010 — Visalia to Bakersfield, 

After a lengthy transfer, two new towns were visited in Stage 5. This was categorized as a flat stage, though a climb with a 14% gradient occurs early in the stage and the finish in Bakersfield included three visits to a climb that tops out over 10% in grade. However, Lance Armstrong crashed just outside Visalia in Stage 5 and had to withdraw from the Tour of California.

Stage 6
May 21, 2010 — Palmdale to Big Bear Lake, 

This has already been declared the queen stage of the 2010 Tour, and may be the most difficult stage in the Tour's five-year history. It was the first Tour of California stage ever to conclude with a mountain climb. The climb to Big Bear Lake reached  in elevation. This stage was originally scheduled to begin at the Rose Bowl in Pasadena, but the roads on which the course would have traveled were damaged by heavy snowfall at high elevations in 2010, making them unsafe to use. The stage began just north of the Angeles National Forest at Palmdale City Hall and visited the San Gabriel and San Bernardino Mountains, incorporating  more climbing than the original course from Pasadena. From there, the race headed south along the Angeles Forest Highway before cutting across the Upper Big Tujunga Canyon to travel on the undamaged part of the course as previously designed.

Stage 7
May 22, 2010 — Los Angeles  (individual time trial)

The one race against the clock for the 2010 Tour took place in Los Angeles, on a longer course than was used in Solvang in the previous three editions of the race. It ran twenty miles over two laps in downtown Los Angeles. The course passed such landmarks as the Millennium Biltmore Hotel, Walt Disney Concert Hall, Cathedral of Our Lady of the Angels, and Los Angeles City Hall, finishing at Chick Hearn Court at L.A. Live. It was expected that the riders complete the course in anywhere from 41 to 48 minutes. The first 90 riders to take the course were staggered one minute at a time, and the final 30 spaced out with two minutes separating their departures.

Stage 8
May 23, 2010 — Thousand Oaks circuit race, 

The Tour concluded with a hilly circuit race in Thousand Oaks, with a steep climb up Mulholland Highway before finishing in Westlake.

Final standings

General Classification

Teams Classification

King of the Mountains Classification

Sprint Classification

Young Rider Classification

Classification leadership

In the 2010 Tour of California, five different jerseys were awarded. For the general classification, calculated by adding the finishing times of the stages per cyclist, the leader received a yellow jersey. This classification was considered the most important of the Tour of California, and the winner of the general classification was considered the winner of the Tour of California.

Additionally, there was also a sprints classification, akin to what is called the points classification in other races, which awarded a green jersey. In the sprints classification, cyclists received points for finishing in the top 10 in a stage. The winner got 15 points, second place 12, third 10, fourth 7, and one point less per place down the line, to a single point for tenth. In addition, some points could be won in intermediate sprints.

There was also a mountains classification, which awarded a red jersey. In the mountains classifications, points were won by reaching the top of a mountain before other cyclists. Each climb was categorized, either first, second, third, or fourth category, with more points available for the harder climbs.

There was also a youth classification. This classification was calculated the same way as the general classification, but only young cyclists (under 23) were in. The leader of the young rider classification received a white jersey.

The fifth jersey was not awarded on the basis of a time or points-based classification. It was for each stage's "Most Courageous" rider, akin to the combativity award in the Tour de France. The rider who received this award as given a blue jersey on the podium, and wore a red bib number in the next stage. Unlike the Tour de France's combativity award, there was no overall award given.

There was also a classification for teams. In this classification, the times of the best three cyclists per stage were added, and the team with the lowest time was leader.

References

External links
 - 2010 Tour Archive

2010
Tour of California
Tour of California
2010 in sports in California